Juan Moreno y Herrera-Jiménez (born 30 July 1948), better known as Jean Reno, is a Spanish-French actor. He has worked in U.S., French, English, Japanese, Spanish and Italian movie productions; Reno appeared in films such as Crimson Rivers, Godzilla, The Da Vinci Code, Mission: Impossible, The Pink Panther, Ronin, Les Visiteurs, Wasabi, The Big Blue, Hector and the Search for Happiness and Léon: The Professional.

Early life
Reno was born Juan Moreno y Herrera-Jiménez, on 30 July 1948 in Casablanca, Morocco. His parents were Spanish, natives of Sanlúcar de Barrameda and Jerez de la Frontera in Andalucia. They had moved to North Africa to find work and escape Francoist Spain. 

He has a younger sister named María Teresa ("Maite"); the children were raised Catholic. Their father was a linotypist. Their mother died when he was a teenager. He learned Spanish from his parents, and Arabic and French growing up in Morocco.

At the age of 17, he moved to France, where he studied acting in the Cours Simon School of Drama.

When he moved to France, he served in the French Army, which was mandatory after his family gained French citizenship.

Career

After he started to get acting jobs in France, Juan adopted the French version of his name, Jean, and shortened his surname to Reno. Due to his large frame, Reno was called on to play "heavies" in his early career. He later appeared in romantic comedies and action films. He began his film career in France, appearing in many films by director Luc Besson, including his early Le Dernier Combat (1983). The two have continued to work together, collaborating in films produced, written, or directed by Besson. Of their joint work, those that have achieved the most critical and commercial success include: La Femme Nikita (1990), and the English-language films The Big Blue (1988) and Léon: The Professional (1994). Reno did the voice-over for Mufasa in the French-language version of The Lion King, a role originally performed in English by James Earl Jones. Reno has starred in such high-profile American films as French Kiss (1995) with Meg Ryan and Kevin Kline, Mission: Impossible (1996) with Tom Cruise, Ronin (1998) with Robert De Niro, and Godzilla (1998) with Matthew Broderick. Reno turned down the role of Agent Smith in The Matrix. He also acted in French productions: Les Visiteurs (1993) (which was remade in English as Just Visiting in 2001); The Crimson Rivers (2000), and Jet Lag (Décalage Horaire) by Danièle Thompson (2002), which was also a box-office success in France.

In 2006, Reno had a prominent role in The Pink Panther 2006 remake and its sequel The Pink Panther 2, playing Gilbert Ponton, opposite Steve Martin as Inspector Clouseau. He portrayed Captain Bezu Fache in the Ron Howard film The Da Vinci Code. Among his most successful films are Les Visiteurs and L'Enquète corse.

In other media, Reno was involved in the production of the third installment in the popular Capcom series Onimusha (Onimusha 3: Demon Siege), lending his likeness to the protagonist Jacques Blanc, as well as providing the voice for the character's French dialogue. In advertising work, Reno has appeared in American television commercials for UPS and portrayed Doraemon in a series of Toyota ads in Japan, as part of the "ReBorn" campaign. He also starred as Jo in the 2013 English-language TV series Jo.

Personal life

Reno married Geneviève in 1977. After his first divorce in 1988, Reno married his second wife, Nathalie Dyszkiewicz, a Polish model, in 1995. They divorced in 2001.

On 29 July 2006, Reno married for the third time, to a British model and actress of Polish descent, Zofia Borucka, at the Les Baux-de-Provence city hall. The presidential candidate Nicolas Sarkozy served as his best man (Reno endorsed Sarkozy for the 2007 French presidential election). Reno maintains three homes in Paris, Malaysia, and Los Angeles.

Filmography

Film

Television

Video games

Stage
 Prends bien garde aux zeppelins (1977)
 Ecce Homo (1978)
 Celimare le bien-aimé (1978)
 Je romps et ne plie pas (1979)
 Société Un (1979)
 La Manufacture (1981)
 Terre étrangère (1984)
 Andromaque (1989)
 Montserrat (1991)
 Les Grandes Occasions (2006)
 Nos femmes (2015)

References

External links

Jean Reno: Cannes, Codes, and... Bouillabaisse (MPM interview)
Couples Retreat Video Interview at AMCtv.com

1948 births
Living people
Alumni of Lycée Lyautey (Casablanca)
European Film Awards winners (people)
French male film actors
French people of Spanish descent
Recipients of the Legion of Honour
Officers of the Ordre national du Mérite
People from Casablanca
20th-century French male actors
21st-century French male actors
French male television actors
French male voice actors